Pavlos "Lakis" Emmanouilidis (born 1 January 1929) is a Greek former professional footballer who played as forward, mostly for AEK Athens. A very fast right midfielder who wrote his own story in AEK and in Greek stadiums.

Club career
Emmanouilidis was born in 1929 at Thiseio and grew up in Patissia, where he was located by Georgios Daispangos and brought to the youth divisions of AEK Athens, before being promoted to the first team in 1947.

He was considered the fastest player of his generation, with a very strong shot, he started as a center-forward but then converted to the position of right midfielder. Simple and spontaneous as a person, with the courage of express opinion, he did not accept to be wronged and was quite impulsive as a result to be punished throughout his career, the most characteristic of which was a four-year exclusion from the national team. In times of amateur football, in parallel with his football career, he also worked as an employee of PPC. Basic and irreplaceable in AEK, despite the great competition that existed for a place in the starting lineup, he had a stable performance and used to upset the opposing defenses, while he could shoot very well with both feet. He won 3 cups with AEK in total of 203 participations in official matches. In 1958 he was seriously injured, underwent surgery and was absent from action for a long time. When he returned, he played in some matches and in 1960 then moved to the Panachaiki where he for four seasons, before his retirement in 1965.

International career
Emmanouilidis was called up to the national team for the first time in 1950 and played a total of 12 times and scored 3 goals until 1958. He made his debut on 13 December 1950 in the home match against the France B, in the Mediterranean Cup, under the instructions of Kostas Negrepontis. He also competed in the men's tournament at the 1952 Summer Olympics in Helsinki. He scored the only goal for Greece in the tournament, in a 2-1 loss against Denmark at Tampere.

Honours

AEK Athens
Greek Cup: 1948–49, 1949–50, 1955–56
Athens FCA Championship: 1950

References

1929 births
Possibly living people
Greece international footballers
Olympic footballers of Greece
Footballers at the 1952 Summer Olympics
AEK Athens F.C. players
Association football forwards
Panachaiki F.C. players
Footballers from Athens
Greek footballers